Bernard A. Hennig (1917 – 2014) was an American philatelist based in Chicago, who acted as chairman of the 1986 Ameripex international exhibition, held in the Chicago area. His main collecting area was Danzig, including proofs, essays and covers, as well as the stamps of Guatemala. He was added to the Roll of Distinguished Philatelists in 1982.  He was inducted into the American Philatelic Society Hall of Fame in 2015.

References

1917 births
2014 deaths
Signatories to the Roll of Distinguished Philatelists
American philatelists